The 22nd Massachusetts General Court, consisting of the Massachusetts Senate and the Massachusetts House of Representatives, met in 1801 and 1802 during the governorship of Caleb Strong. David Cobb served as president of the Senate and Edward Robbins served as speaker of the House.

Senators

Representatives

See also
 7th United States Congress
 List of Massachusetts General Courts

References

External links
 . (Includes data for state senate and house elections in 1801)
 
 

Political history of Massachusetts
Massachusetts legislative sessions
massachusetts
1801 in Massachusetts
massachusetts
1802 in Massachusetts